Science Digest was a monthly American magazine published by the Hearst Corporation from 1937 through 1988.

History
Science Digest was first published in January 1937 in an 8 x 5 inch digest size format of about 100 pages. First edited by G.W. Stamm, it was targeted at persons with a high school education level. It contained short articles about general science often excerpted from other publications in the style of Reader's Digest. The headquarters of Science Digest was in Des Moines, Iowa.

In November 1980 the magazine was expanded to an 11 x 8 inch glossy page format with full-length articles and color pictures targeted at a college-educated reader. The new version was largely the creation of its then editor Scott DeGarmo. It was issued bi-monthly with circulation of about 500,000 copies. At first it tended to favor breathless cover lines, and often turned to pseudoscience topics, including spontaneous human combustion and UFOs. Unable to compete with more serious publications, such as Discover and Omni, the magazine ceased publication in 1986.

The magazine briefly re-appeared as a quarterly in 1987, returning to the original small "digest" format, with many short articles and snippets of science information. This final relaunch lasted only one year.

Omega Science Digest
An Australian edition under the title Omega Science Digest began in January 1981 and had a circulation of 40,000. Omega, unlike its American counterpart, carried two original fiction stories per issue.

Columnists
Hugh Downs
Isaac Asimov

References

Bimonthly magazines published in the United States
Monthly magazines published in the United States
Defunct magazines published in the United States
Defunct digests
Magazines established in 1937
Magazines disestablished in 1986
Magazines published in Iowa
Mass media in Des Moines, Iowa
Science and technology magazines published in the United States